Gulval is a village in Cornwall, England, United Kingdom. Although historically a parish in its own right, Gulval was incorporated into the parishes of Ludgvan, Madron and Penzance in 1934, and is now considered to be a suburb of Penzance. Gulval still maintains its status as an ecclesiastical parish and parts of the village church date back to the 12th-century. Together with Heamoor, Gulval still retains its status as an electoral ward. The ward population at the 2011 census was 4,185.

Name origins
The parish is named after a 6th-century saint, Gulval, the original form of which was probably Welvela or Wolvela. Baring-Gould thought this was Wilgitha, the sister of Saint Juthwara: David Nash Ford agrees. Gilbert Hunter Doble, however, favoured an identification with one of the male Welsh missionaries, Gudwall or Gurwall who are honoured in Brittany, eponym of Locoal-Mendon. A life of each one is to be found in the Acta Sanctorum, June; Bollandists, 1867. Neither identification has been widely accepted by modern scholars. Previous spellings of the parish include St Welvela de Lanesky (from 1301), St Welvele (1327), St Welvele de Lanystly (1328), Gwelvele/Wolvele de Lanescly (c.1400), St Golvele (c.1400) and Gulval/Lanesly (1535). The parish church is dedicated to Gulval and his/her feast is celebrated on 12 November.

History

	
During the Iron Age there was a lot of activity in the area, and a few miles from Gulval, beyond the hamlet of Badgers Cross, are the remains of the Chysauster settlement. The site shows the remnants of nine courtyard houses, of a type only found on the Land's End peninsula and Isles of Scilly, and was inhabited from the first century BC for the following four hundred years. The historic Celtic site is now under the protection of English Heritage.

Two inscribed stones attest to continued occupation in the early medieval period. The first is a memorial for "Quenatucus, son of Dinvus", and has been dated as carved sometime between fifth and eighth centuries; it stands near one end of a footbridge in Balowena Bottom. The second is a cross-shaft lacking base or cross-head with a now illegible inscription; it was found in a wall of the church in 1885, and now stands in the churchyard. (see also, Gulval Church, below)

There is a Cornish cross at Rosemorran; on the front of the head is a crude crucifixus figure and on the back is an unusually shaped cross (the only similar one is at Lelant).

In ancient times Gulval was known as Lanisley, derived from Lan, a church, and ishei, low, (i.e. the low church). According to Charles Henderson (quoted by Doble (1960)) this is a corruption of Laniskley.  A Latinised version of this, Landicle, is mentioned in the Domesday Book:

"Roland holds [LANDICLE](GULVAL) from the Bishop; In the time of King Edward (the Confessor, i.e. before 1066) it paid tax for 1 hide (around 120 acres); 1½ hides there however. Land for 12 ploughs (requiring, perhaps, 8 oxen each); in lordship 1 plough; 3 slaves. 13 villagers and 4 smallholders with 3 ploughs. Meadow , Pasture, 2 leagues long and 1 league wide. Value formerly and now £3. 1 virgate (about 30 acres) held by the lord, 1 hide 3 virgates by the villagers; also "1 cob; 3 cows; 30 sheep". (Roland was the Archdeacon of Cornwall.)

Landmarks

There is a war memorial located in Gulval Church's cemetery, with 18 soldiers from WWI and 10 from WWII.

Gulval Church
  
The current church building is predominantly 12th-century with subsequent additions. Most notable of these are the tower, built in 1440 and containing eight bells, and a large stone lych-gate that was added in 1897 to celebrate Queen Victoria's Diamond Jubilee. The churchyard was extended on the southern side in 1882 and a lych-gate erected, opposite Posses Lane. The land was donated by the Lords of Llanisley manor. The wooden roof of the north gateway was presented by the architect Piers St Aubyn of Devonport in July, 1885. According to The Cornishman newspaper, while it was generally admired, it was thought it would look much better if it was about a foot higher! 

There is an ornamented Cornish cross shaft in the churchyard. It was found in 1885 when the chancel was restored. The chancel was formed of two walls with the space between them filled with loose clay-like rubble and the cross was used to bond the two walls together. The cross is re-erected in the churchyard, and is of the Greek form and has the letters ″I A″ inscribed, which is thought to refer to St Ia, of St Ives.

There is a stained glass window commemorating William Wingfield, MP, in the church. One of the vicars of Gulval, the Rev. William W. Wingfield, was vicar for a remarkable 72 years, from 1839 until his death in 1912. In 1873, during Wingfield's tenure, the churchyard was extended on the northern side and a row of elm planted.

Legends

Joseph of Arimathea
Within the bounds of the parish lies the disused Ding Dong mine, reputedly one of the oldest in Cornwall. Popular local legend claims that Joseph of Arimathea, a tin trader, visited the mine and brought a young Jesus to address the miners, although there is no evidence to support this. The Ding Dong mines have, according to tradition, been worked since Roman times but by the end of the 18th century it was disused. In 1814 it was reopened and worked until 1878. Attempts were made in 1912 and 1928 to reopen, but these failed.

Notable people
 Dudley Savage (20 March 1920 – 25 November 2008), theatre organist known for the long-running BBC radio request programme "As Prescribed", was born in Gulval.

Local government and village amenities
For purposes of local government Gulval is included in the civil parish of Penzance and has its own single member ward on Penzance town council. The principal local authority in the area is Cornwall Council. Elections to Cornwall Council are by way of a three-member Penzance electoral division.

Gulval is home to a post office and general store, a public house and a primary school that houses 144 pupils.

Transport
The A30 runs to the south of Gulval Churchtown between Long Rock and Penzance. The main bus route through Gulval is number 16.

Penzance itself has more transport links, including a railway station.

Sport and recreation
Gulval has two football teams competing in the Trelawny League and two cricket teams competing in the Cornwall Cricket League.

The local community radio station is Coast FM (formerly Penwith Radio), which broadcasts on 96.5 and 97.2 FM.

See also

 Listed buildings in Gulval

References

External links
 Cornwall Online Parish Clerks website
 Cornwall Record Office Online Catalogue for Gulval
 The history of the Count House of Ding Dong Mine

Former civil parishes in Cornwall
Penzance
Villages in Cornwall
Joseph of Arimathea